Endogonales is an order of fungi within the phylum of Zygomycota. It contains 2 families, Endogonaceae, with four genera and 27 species and Densosporaceae, with one genera and 5 species.

Genera
Endogonaceae;
 Endogone  
 Jimgerdemannia 
 Jimwhitea†
 Peridiospora 
 Sclerogone 
 Youngiomyces

Densosporaceae;
 Densospora (Species: D. nanospora – D. nuda – D. solicarpa – D. tubiformis)

Life cycle
The life cycle of the Endogonales is distinguished by their production of small sporocarps containing many zygospores, which are eaten by rodents and distributed by their faeces.

They also produce a fetid odour that attracts mammals and encourages them to eat their fruiting bodies, and so spread their spores.

Food
Like all fungi, they are heterotrophs with some being described as saprobes (with weak evidence).

References

Zygomycota
Fungus orders